Dance VS Dance Season 2  is the second season of the Tamil reality dancing TV show Dance vs Dance, was aired on Colors Tamil from 17 October 2021. The finals of the show concluded on 9 January 2022 with Manoj and Amritha finishing as the winner, taking home a shared 5 lakh prize money. The show was hosted by Bhavana Balakrishnan. The competition was judged by former actress Khushboo Sundar and dance choreographer Brinda.

Contestants

The show started off with 16 pairs of dancers and a pair was eliminated every week until the quarter-final week where 2 couples faced spot elimination. The following were the contestants who managed to participate in the finals of the show:

Manoj and Amritha 
Prithvi and Thiyan 
Kavya and Mahalakshmi
Royson and Mercina 
Vinosh and Kabeer 
Karthick and Thiyagu

Format
The show followed a similar pattern to that of Season 1 except 6 finalists were allowed to progress. Khushboo Sundar was also given a special lifeline to save one of the contestants at elimination. In the semi-final week, Khushboo Sundar chose to bring back Manoj and Amritha (the current winners of the show) to the finals through her lifeline. The duo were eliminated in the Quarter-Final round. The new format also started with 4 actresses/actors/dancers who were the group leaders of 4 individual teams. The first round concentrated on picking the couples each team leader thought would be best for their team. The team leaders were Ineya, Sridhar, Shaam, and Abhirami Venkatachalam.

Prize Money
Manoj and Amritha won 5 lakhs for winning the competition. Prithvi and Thiyan finished second winning 3 lakhs whilst classical duo Kavya and Mahalakshmi won 2 lakhs. Kreethy Soundar, the choreographer of Kavya and Mahalakshmi successfully earned the Best Choreographer of the Season Award which was present to her by Kala Master who was appearing as a guest in the finals of the show. She is also the elder sister of Brinda

References

Colors Tamil original programming
Tamil-language dance television shows
Tamil-language reality television series
2020s Tamil-language television series
2021 Tamil-language television series debuts
Tamil-language television shows
2021 Tamil-language television seasons